Nuts Entertainment is a Philippine television sketch comedy show broadcast by GMA Network. Starring Joey de Leon, Janno Gibbs and Anjo Yllana, it premiered on April 30, 2003 on the network's KiliTV line up. The show concluded on December 27, 2008 with a total of 608 episodes. It was replaced by Kapuso Movie Festival in its timeslot.

Cast

Lead cast
Joey de Leon 
Janno Gibbs 
Anjo Yllana 

Supporting cast
Richard Gutierrez 
Pekto 
John Feir 
Iwa Moto 
Alfred Vargas 
Ehra Madrigal 
Keempee de Leon 
Ariel Villasanta 
Maverick Relova 
Baba Gee 
Peejay
Rufa Mi 
MC 
Anne Curtis 
Joyce Jimenez 
Gelli de Belen 
Carmina Villaroel 
Sherwin Ordonez 
Brad Turvey 
Aleck Bovick 
Greg Turvey 
Jacky Woo

Segments
 Jak en Poy
 Balakubak: Balita at Kuwentong Bakla
 Kaso de Bola
 Asar Talo
 30 Gays
 L.B.M. (Lusob Bahay Mo)
 I Write the Songs
 Korteng Mani
 Here, Dare and Everywhere
 Manibela / Manobela
 Pu-Tetris Ka!
 Pares Pares

Accolades

References

External links
 

2003 Philippine television series debuts
2008 Philippine television series endings
Filipino-language television shows
GMA Network original programming
Philippine television sketch shows